Bete-Bendi, or Bendi, is one of the Bendi languages of Nigeria. There are 100,000 speakers as of 2006.

References

Bendi languages
Languages of Nigeria